Hunasuru Assembly Seat, also spelled Hunsur, is one of the 224 assembly constituencies in Karnataka state in India. It is part of Mysore (Lok Sabha constituency).

Members of Assembly 
Source:

Election results

1972 Elections
 U. Kariyappa Gowda (INC) : 25,711 votes
 H. Hombe Gowda (NCO) : 11,960

1978 Elections
 D.Devaraj Urs (INC(I)) : 36,766 votes
 H.L. Thimmegowda (JNP) : 24,711

2018 Elections
 Adaguru H Vishwanath (JD(S)) : 91,667 votes
 H P Manjunath (INC) : 83,092

2019 bypoll
 H P Manjunath (INC) : 92,725 votes
 Adaguru H Vishwanath (BJP) : 39,727

See also
 List of constituencies of Karnataka Legislative Assembly

References

Assembly constituencies of Karnataka